The Virgin of El Panecillo (in Spanish: Virgen del Panecillo), also known as the Virgin of Quito from the sculpture of the same name, is a monument in Quito, Ecuador. It is located on the top of the hill of El Panecillo, a loaf-shaped hill in the heart of the city and serves as a backdrop to the historic center of Quito.

With a total height of  including the base, it is the highest statue in Ecuador and one of the highest in South America (taller than the Christ the Redeemer statue in the Brazilian city of Rio de Janeiro). It's also the tallest aluminum statue in the world.

History

In the 1950s, local authorities and religious leaders stood looking at El Panecillo, a loaf-shaped, 656-foot-high (200 meters) hill in central Quito. They agreed that the hilltop, visible throughout the city, was the perfect place to erect a statue. After years of debate, they decided that the statue would be a large replica of the Virgin of Quito, a 48-inch-tall wooden sculpture created by Bernardo de Legarda in 1734.

Designed and built by the Spanish sculptor Agustín de la Herrán Matorras, the statue is made from 7,400 pieces of aluminum, with each piece clearly numbered. The statue was then disassembled, shipped to Ecuador, and assembled again on top of the base. The statue was finished on March 28, 1975.

Gallery

References

External links

 Official website (in Spanish)

Buildings and structures in Quito
Statues of the Virgin Mary
1975 sculptures
1975 in Ecuador
1975 architecture